Theretra muricolor is a moth of the  family Sphingidae. It is known from Papua New Guinea.

It is very similar to Theretra queenslandi but smaller and the forewing ground colour is pale grey. The forewing upperside is as in Theretra queenslandi, but the ground colour is pale silvery-grey. Consequently, the dark discal spot is much more conspicuous. The hindwing upperside is also as in Theretra queenslandi, but the paler marginal area is broader.

References

Theretra
Moths described in 1926